9O or 9-O may refer to:

9O, IATA code for National Airways Cameroon
9°, an abbreviation for ninth in some languages
Grêmio Atlético do 9° Regimento; see Grêmio Atlético Farroupilha
9O–9T, the ITU prefix codes for Democratic Republic of the Congo
9O, squadron code for No. 44 Maintenance Unit; see List of RAF Squadron Codes

See also
9°
O9 (disambiguation)
 ㅒ